Agrilus parvus is a species of metallic wood-boring beetle in the family Buprestidae. It is found in North America.

Subspecies
These two subspecies belong to the species Agrilus parvus:
 Agrilus parvus californicus Westcott & Nelson, 2000
 Agrilus parvus parvus Saunders, 1870

References

Further reading

 
 
 

parvus
Articles created by Qbugbot
Beetles described in 1870